Alessio Faustini (born 10 June 1960) is an Italian former long-distance runner.

Biography
Alessio Faustini participated at one edition of the Summer Olympics (1992), he has 13 caps in national team from 1981 to 1992. He is not relative of the other Italian marathon runner Osvaldo Faustini.

Achievements

References

External links
 
 Alessio Faustini at All-Athletics web site

1960 births
Living people
Italian male long-distance runners
Italian male marathon runners
Olympic athletes of Italy
Athletes (track and field) at the 1992 Summer Olympics
World Athletics Championships athletes for Italy
Universiade medalists in athletics (track and field)
Universiade gold medalists for Italy
Athletics competitors of Fiamme Oro
Medalists at the 1983 Summer Universiade
20th-century Italian people